Gangsterdam is a 2017 French comedy film starring Kev Adams, Manon Azem, Côme Levin and Rutger Hauer.

Plot
A student in Amsterdam tries to win over a young woman by chasing after a packet of drugs, which happens to belong to the Dutch mafia.

Cast
 Kev Adams as Ruben Jablonski
 Manon Azem as Nora
 Côme Levin as Durex
 Hubert Koundé as Ulysse Abraham Bakel
 Mona Walravens as June
 Rutger Hauer as Dolph Van Tannen
 Alex Hendrickx as Caspar Van Tannen
 Ido Mosseri as Amos Ben Soussan
 Patrick Timsit as Serge Jablonski
 Manu Payet as Mischka
 Talid Ariss as Jonas Jablonski
 Seno Sever as Souleymane
 Pim Vesters as Invite

References

External links
 

2017 films
French comedy films
Films scored by Robin Coudert
2010s French films